The Monument to the Fighters of the Revolution is a memorial on the Field of Mars in Saint Petersburg. It marks the burial places of some of those who died during the February and October Revolutions in 1917, and casualties who died between 1917 and 1933 in the Russian Civil War or otherwise in the establishment of Soviet power. It contains the first eternal flame in Russia.

The Field of Mars was selected by the Petrograd Soviet as the site for the ceremonial burials of those who had died during the February Revolution, which had toppled the tsarist autocracy. 184 bodies were interred in communal graves at the centre of the field, and a competition was announced for the design of a monument to those buried there. The competition was won by architect Lev Rudnev and consisted of granite walls forming the corners of a square enclosing a central space. Other prominent figures in the early Soviet government, and those who had died fighting to establish Soviet power, were buried on the site, as were those who died during the October Revolution. The monument, and the Field of Mars in general, became a pantheon to those who had died in the service of the state. Large granite tablets at the end of each wall carried epitaphs by People's Commissar of Education Anatoly Lunacharsky, extolling the virtues and sacrifices of those buried there. The Field of Mars was for a time renamed the "Victims of Revolution Square", and was sometimes called "The Square of the Graves of the Victims of the Revolution".

Burials ceased after 1933, though the monument continued to be developed. Used for vegetable gardens and the site of artillery batteries during the siege of Leningrad, the name "Field of Mars" was restored in 1944, and the square was repaired after the war. The central space of the memorial, which had been covered with a circular lawn and floral displays, was replaced with a paved square in the late 1950s, with the first eternal flame in Russia at the centre, lit in 1957. The flame has been used as the source of eternal flames elsewhere in the city and in Russia, including the Tomb of the Unknown Soldier near the Moscow Kremlin Wall.

Location and design

Since the founding of the city, the space occupied by the Field of Mars had been at times the site of parks, pleasure gardens, festivities, and military parades. The monument occupies the centre of the field and consists of four L-shaped walls of grey granite enclosing a central square. The enclosed square contains the communal graves of some of those who died during the February and October Revolutions. Additional graves are around the enclosed area, marked by 12 plaques listing the names of the prominent Soviet figures buried there. The middle of the space is marked with a paved surface, with an eternal flame in the centre.

Revolutionary burials
After the February Revolution, the Petrograd Soviet decided to create an honorary communal burial ground for those who had been killed in the unrest. The option of interment in an existing cemetery was rejected, with the argument that the burial site had to be "important, eloquent, a place of pilgrimage within the city centre." Various locations were proposed:  and Palace Squares, the Summer and Tauride Gardens, and the Field of Mars. The Soviet initially selected Palace Square as the location for the graves but changed this to the Field of Mars after representations from prominent artists, including Maxim Gorky. An important consideration was the plan to site the putative Constituent Assembly on the Field of Mars, which would then overlook a monument to those who had died in the revolution. Architects Yevgeny-Karl Schröter, Lev Rudnev, and A. L. Shilovsky oversaw the preparations of four large L-shaped communal graves in the centre of the Field of Mars.

Relatives of the dead hurried to claim and bury them in other cemeteries with the traditional rites. The accepted death toll of the 'victims of February' was 1,382, of whom 869 were soldiers who had mutinied, and 237 were workers. Ultimately only 184 victims were buried on the Field of Mars, comprising 86 soldiers, 9 sailors, 2 officers, 32 workers, 6 women, 23 people for whom social status could not be determined, and 26 unknown dead. The city soviet declared 5 April a day off work, and nearly a million citizens turned out to join the funeral processions, which carried the dead from the hospitals and chapels across the city, accompanied by the singing of La Marseillaise and the revolutionary hymn You Fell Victim to a Fateful Struggle. The graves had been prepared by blasting trenches in the frozen ground, with the lowering of each coffin marked by a cannon shot from the Peter and Paul Fortress. By one estimate some 800,000 people attended the funerals. No clergy were allowed to officiate or participate in the ceremonies. Historian Richard Stites remarks that the funerals were the "first secular outdoor ceremony in Russian history, the first major non-oppositional and all-class ceremony in the lifetime of the Provisional Government, and the only one also without a central charismatic figure as a focus." Nevertheless, when some of the coffins, which had been draped in red material, were uncovered for burial, they found to be inlaid with Orthodox crosses. Following the funerals the Bolshevik newspaper Pravda carried pieces by leading party members Lev Kamenev and Alexandra Kollontai calling for the response to the deaths to be the securing and building of new freedoms in a democratic Russia.

Creation of the memorial

A competition for the design of the memorial was opened almost immediately after the funerals had taken place. A commission was set up to judge the entries, consisting of prominent architects, artists and writers, including: Ivan Fomin, Alexandre Benois, Kuzma Petrov-Vodkin, Mstislav Dobuzhinsky, Ivan Bilibin, Alexander Blok, Maxim Gorky, and Anatoly Lunacharsky. Eleven designs were submitted. One envisaged a huge tetrahedral metal pyramid with a female figure at the top, symbolising the freedom of the Russian people. Another proposed the creation of a giant cube, angled on inverted truncated pyramids, while yet another version was for a high four-tiered tower with rooms built into it. Variations on creating a  column along the lines of Auguste de Montferrand's Alexander Column were also presented. The commission rejected most of the entrants on the grounds of being disproportionate to the scale of the location and likely to distort the city's historical appearance. The design selected was that put forward by Lev Rudnev, to the "Fighters of the Revolution". Modest in comparison to some of the proposals, it had the advantage at a time of straitened finances of re-using materials from the Salniy Buyan, a collection of storage yards and warehouses along the river , which had been dismantled before the war as part of the expansion of the neighbouring shipyard. Large granite blocks were thus readily available. The monument to the "Fighters of the Revolution" was opened on 7 November 1919. It consisted of four large L-shaped granite walls enclosing an open space at the centre of the Field of Mars. Epitaphs by Anatoly Lunacharsky, People's Commissar of Education, were inscribed on eight large tablets placed at the end of each wall.

Soviet pantheon 

The burials of the dead of the February Revolution started a trend for the Field of Mars to become a pantheon of those who died in the service of the revolution and the achievement of Soviet power. The first individual burial, that of V. Volodarsky, took place on 23 June 1918. Volodarsky, a member of the Presidium of the All-Russian Central Executive Committee, had been assassinated three days earlier. Other interments that year included Moisei Uritsky, chairman of the Petrograd Cheka who was assassinated in August 1918, and Semyon Nakhimson, who was killed in the Yaroslavl Uprising in July 1918. Further burials took place later that year, when a number of the dead of the October Revolution were interred. On the first anniversary of the October Revolution the Field of Mars was renamed the "Victims of Revolution Square" and was sometimes called "The Square of the Graves of the Victims of the Revolution." Individual burials continued over the next few years, with the Civil War commander A. S. Rakov in 1919 and All-Russian Central Executive Committee member  in 1920. Other communal interments were the eight members of the Finnish Communist Party killed in the Kuusinen Club Incident in 1920, seven officers of the 3rd Petrograd Rifle Regiment killed when the regiment defected in 1919, and four members of the Latvian Riflemen killed during the Yaroslavl rising in 1920.

The layout of the square was further developed following the installation of the monument, with gardens and pathways to the design of Ivan Fomin. The redesign was completed in 1921, and on 25 October the square was transferred to the city's Garden and Park Administration. In 1922 the Comintern and the All-Russian Central Executive Committee proposed creating a monument to the October Revolution, but the project was never carried out. The last burial on the square, that of the secretary of the Leningrad city committee of the CPSU , took place on 8 October 1933. The graves are marked with granite plaques, some with a single name, others with multiple names. Another plaque states "Here are buried those who died in the days of the February Revolution and the leaders of the Great October Socialist Revolution who fell in battles during the Civil War".

Postwar 

The square was laid out with vegetable gardens during summer 1942 to help feed the city during the siege of Leningrad, and also hosted an artillery battery. The square's former name, the Field of Mars, was restored on 13 January 1944. It underwent further reconstruction between 1947 and 1955, and in 1957 a new design for the central area of the memorial by  resulted in a paved square with an eternal flame lit on 6 November 1957, in memory of the victims of various wars and revolutions. The flame, lit from the open-hearth furnace of the Kirov Factory, was the first eternal flame in Russia. The flame from the Field of Mars was also used to light the eternal flame at the Piskaryovskoye Memorial Cemetery on 9 May 1960, and at other memorials in Saint Petersburg. The flame was delivered to Moscow in 1967 and on 8 May it was used to light the eternal flame on the Tomb of the Unknown Soldier near the Kremlin Wall.

The square was once more reconstructed between 1998 and 2001. Over 3,800 new bushes and trees were planted, and the paths and lawns were repaired. The monument to the "Fighters of the Revolution" was also restored, being relit on 14 November 2003 with a flame once again taken from the Kirov Factory's furnace. By the early 2000s, with parking and transport around the city becoming problematic, proposals have occasionally been made to build a car park under the Field of Mars. The presence of graves has led residents to oppose these plans. By April 2014 the names on the granite slabs were becoming indistinct. Experts from the  carried out maintenance involving the preventative washing of the granite walls and plaques, and repairing the text of the inscriptions.

Named burials

References

1919 establishments in Russia
Monuments and memorials in Saint Petersburg